Pouliot is a Canadian surname that may refer to
Adrien Pouliot (1896–1980), Canadian mathematician and educator
Adrien Pouliot Award, presented annually by the Canadian Mathematical Society
Adrien D. Pouliot (born c. 1958), Quebec businessman and politician
Anais Pouliot (born 1991), Canadian model
Barthélemy Pouliot (1811–1890), Quebec businessman and political figure
Benoît Pouliot (born 1986), Canadian ice hockey left winger 
Blake Pouliot (born 1994), Canadian-American classical violinist
Camille-Eugène Pouliot (1897–1967), Canadian physician and politician
Charles-Eugène Pouliot (1856–1897), Quebec lawyer and political figure 
Derrick Pouliot (born 1994), Canadian ice hockey defenceman
François A. Pouliot (1896–1990), Canadian politician
Georges Pouliot (1923–2019), Canadian fencer
Gilles Pouliot (born 1942), Canadian politician 
Jean Pouliot (1923–2004), Canadian TV broadcasting pioneer
Jean-Baptiste Pouliot (1816–1888), Quebec notary and political figure 
Jean-François Pouliot (born 1957), Quebec film director
Jean-François Pouliot (politician) (1890–1969), Quebec lawyer, author and political figure 
Marc-Antoine Pouliot (born 1985), Canadian ice hockey player
Mario Pouliot (born 1963), Canadian ice hockey coach and general manager
Matthew Pouliot (born 1986), American politician

French-language surnames